Graveyard of Honor may refer to either of two films:
Graveyard of Honor (1975 film), directed by Kinji Fukasaku
Graveyard of Honor (2002 film), directed by Takashi Miike